Love Island is a dating reality show that originated in the United Kingdom in 2005 as Celebrity Love Island. Created by ITV Studios, it has spawned a second British version in 2015 as well as several international versions.

The show features a group of "single" contestants, known as "islanders" who live together in a specially constructed villa that is isolated from the outside world, in an attempt to find love. The islanders are continuously monitored during their stay in the house by live television cameras as well as personal audio microphones. Throughout the series, the contestants "couple up" to avoid being dumped from the villa. Additionally, the public will vote for their favourite islanders to stay in the villa at points in the series. As old islanders are dumped, new islanders enter the villa. At the end of the season, the public vote one final time to determine the winning couple.

International versions

Legend:

 Currently airing franchise
 Franchise with an upcoming season
 Franchise no longer airing
 Status unknown

On 11 September 2017, a German version of Love Island premiered on RTL II. An Australian version was commissioned by the Nine Network for its secondary channel 9Go! and internationally it airs on ITVBe and 3e with international streaming available on Hulu and ITVX. On 8 August 2018, CBS ordered an American version of the show.

The Dutch-Flemish version was cancelled after one season in 2019, alongside Temptation Island and Free Love Paradise, as a result of a sexual assault scandal in one of RTL's other reality series De Villa.

On 21 September 2020, it was announced by ITV Studios that a Spanish version of the show and a Nigerian version of the show were both in pre-production. The Nigerian version was commissioned by Digital Play Networks and will air on TVC and 9 Vision Media in Nigeria. The Spanish version was commissioned by Atresmedia and will air on Neox in Spain.

On 6 November 2020, South African TV Network M-Net ordered a South African version of the show which premiered on 28 February 2021.

On October 20, 2021, the Telemundo television network announced the Latin version of the program, which premiered on November 17, 2021.

In the summer of 2022, the idea of a "middle-aged" version of the program was proposed in the UK. In January 2023, ITV confirmed that the new version of the program has been ordered and was in pre-production with The Romance Retreat being the title of the show and Davina McCall being slated, but not confirmed, to be the host.

Locations
All versions of Love Island have been shot in villas located around the world.

See also
MTV Splitsvilla, similar 2008 Indian show
The Real Love Boat, similar American and Australian show

Notes

References

 
Reality television series franchises
Television series by ITV Studios
Television franchises